Basil Sellers AM, (born 1935), grew up in the Railway Colonies in India, where he was introduced to badminton, tennis and cricket. He migrated with his family to Australia in 1948, and was educated at Kings College, Adelaide. As a businessman and philanthropist, Basil made his career working with ailing companies. Basil never went to university and instead learned his business skill on the job. Leaving school at 16, he started working at the Bank of South Australia then two years later joined a stock broking firm. He has been quoted as saying "Stock broking was great fun! It was the foundation for all my experience because I was learning about raising funds and evaluating stocks – all of the things you have to do as an entrepreneur. That was my university."

Career

Basil Sellers has been chief executive and major shareholder of companies such as the Linter Group Ltd, the largest textile company in Australia; and Gestetner PLC, then a UK listed company (now part of Ricoh). Basil Sellers has also held a major investment in AFP, which had various investments, including Elders Ltd (now Fosters Brewery), broadcast media and mineral resources.

Honours

In February 2018, Basil was awarded an Honorary Doctorate by Bond University in recognition of his significant charitable work, sports development and corporate acumen.

Sport

In sport, Basil played Senior Basketball, representing South Australia when the team won the Australian Championship in 1958. During the 1980s he was the owner of the Newcastle Basketball team and from 1984–87, he was a Director of the New South Wales Cricket Association (now Cricket New South Wales). He is a Life Member of Cricket NSW.

His major charities include The McGrath Foundation, where he is a major donor, financing the salaries of breast care nurses in Australia, he is a First XI patron of the Steve Waugh Foundation and a generous supporter of the Pick Me UP wheelchair service for the Sir Roden & Lady Cutler Foundation. He is a Patron of The LBW Trust which raises funds for the education of over 800 disadvantaged youth in developing, cricket-playing countries. The LBW Trust enjoys the support of redoubtable figures across politics, business, sports and public life.

His donations to sporting initiatives and scholarships include the Barassi Scholarship, supporting new talent for the Sydney Swans and he is a major contributor to the Club's football centre at the SCG.

He also assists initiatives that identify and support emerging talent in country NSW cricket.  Some of his past and current scholars include Phillip Hughes, Steven Smith, Usman Khawaja, Mitchell Starc. Josh Hazlewood, Patrick Cummins, Nic Maddinson, Ellyse Perry, Alyssa Healy and Erin Osborne.  He is a Life Member of Cricket NSW.

The scholarship helps ease the financial burden of up-and-coming cricketers, whether it be assisting with the cost of petrol travelling to and from training, equipment or helping with study.

With his brother Rex Sellers, he funded the reconstruction of a Pavilion for sport for Pembroke School at Kensington Oval in South Australia.

Basil is one of the founders of the Bradman Museum in Bowral, New South Wales and a life member of the Bradman Foundation. He funded a respite centre in Moruya for elite athletes from the Australian Institute of Sport, Canberra, and similar centres in Tweed Heads. (see link below)

Art

The Basil Sellers Art Prize was founded in 2004 by Basil in the Eurobodalla Shire. In 2018 the biennial prize was opened to include artists from NSW and ACT with the major prize increasing to $20,000.

In February 2019, was the official opening of the Basil Sellers Exhibition Centre (the Bas) in Moruya, its first purpose-built exhibition space.

Basil provided a significant donation for the exhibition space and it was named after him for his contribution to the Arts in Eurobodalla.

Sport and Art

Basil has been recognised as a keen art collector and patron. Collecting for over 35 years, his collection contains Post War Australian art and many of the European modernists, with a particular interest in the Fauves (1906/7). Basil has also funded the bi-annual art prize of $15,000 in the South East of New South Wales.

In 2007 Basil Sellers launched the Basil Sellers Art Prize which was initiated in 2008, in association with the Ian Potter Museum of Art, the University of Melbourne. The first prize of $100,000 is awarded to an Australian who produces a piece of art which incorporates an image of sport. Basil believes that art in the past has reflected society (wars, religion, ballet, horses, etc.) but in recent years has ignored the vast influence of sport. The award bridges the gulf which exists and connects art and sport and is bi-annual.

In 2009, Basil's philanthropic support also gave rise to the inaugural National Sports Museum Basil Sellers Creative Arts Fellowship. This important initiative provides contemporary art practitioners with a unique opportunity to engage with the material and culture of our national sporting heritage through the collections managed by the National Sports Museum at the MCG.  This bi-annual fellowship will increase the range and type of educational and public programs, and stimulate debate about sport and art.

He has recently concluded the Basil Sellers Sports Sculpture Project of ten sculptures erected at the Sydney Cricket Ground. The sculptures are of four Cricket, two Rugby League, two Rugby Union and two Australian Football icons. He is currently the benefactor of a similar project for the Adelaide which consists of four Cricket and four Australian football icons of South Australia at the Adelaide Oval.

Other initiatives and Donations

Basil's philanthropy extends to his birthplace, India. He funded the purchase of a property in Chennai for the education of young girls from the slums. With the additional features from the new property ANEW was able to graduate 1000 students per year and find them all full-time employment. 

Basil is involved in the promotion and investment of winery. He is a major sponsor of the Len Evans Tutorial that aims to improve the quality of Australian wines by training and giving access to the world's best wines. The Tutorial is aimed at wine judges winemakers and sommeliers.

Patronage

Basil is a Patron of the LBW Trust which provides education to disadvantaged students in low income cricket playing nations, and is also a Patron of the Chappell Foundation which seeks to help young homeless people in Australia.

Personal

Basil is married to Clare and has three children from his first marriage, Paul, Darrell and Libby, and has four grandchildren.

Basil's only sibling Rex Sellers, who was a Test cricketer for Australia lives in Adelaide with his wife Ann and has 3 children and 7 grandchildren.

Books

 "From India with Love" by Dr Gloria Jean Moore, 2006 –

External links
 ABC: The World Today
 Potter Art Museum, Melbourne University
 The Len Evans Tutorial

References

 History of the Sydney Swans
 Basil Sellers Centre – Chennai, India
 Steve Waugh Foundation
 Basil Sellers Art Prize
 Sir Roden & Lady Cutler Foundation
 McGrath Foundation
 Cricket NSW

Australian chief executives
Australian men's basketball players
Anglo-Indian people
Indian emigrants to Australia
Australian people of Anglo-Indian descent
Australian sportspeople of Indian descent
Living people
1935 births
People educated at Pembroke School, Adelaide